Los Cocorocos was a collaborative album between salsa and reggaeton singers released in 2006 by indie CMG (Coalition Music Group) distributed by Universal/MOTOWN. The album fused sounds between salsa and reggaeton.

This production has musical arrangements by Charlie Donato, Domingo Quiñones, Jose Lugo and Willie Sotello.

“Los hombres tienen la culpa” by Gilberto Santa Rosa and Don Omar was the debut single of this release and an original by producer Charlie Donato. Recorded at “Major League Music Studios”, with Corey Hill as sound engineer and mixed by Marioso.

Tracks

Intro - Gallego 1:50
Los Hombres Tienen la Culpa - Don Omar & Gilberto Santa Rosa 4:45
Dos Jueyes - Zion & Domingo Quiñones 3:48
Che Che Cole - Tego Calderón & Víctor Manuelle 4:05
Mal Aguero - La Sister & Domingo Quiñones 3:38
Perdona Viejo - Papo Rosario & Aniel Rosario 4:17
Los Gorditos - Tito Nieves, John Eric, and Pedro Bull 4:47
Ayi Viene Mista - Mista 3:55
Mulata Rumbera - Junior Gonzalez & Plaza 4:16
Esa Nena - J-king y Maximan 3:07
Mafo Crew - Mafo Crew 3:25
La Wasa - Symphonia 4:01
Claro de Luna - Voltio 3:14

Chart position

Album

Singles

See also
List of number-one Billboard Tropical Albums from the 2000s

References

Salsa compilation albums
Reggaeton compilation albums
2006 compilation albums
Spanish-language compilation albums